Dr. Krishnamurtha (Kanniks) Kannikeswaran, popularly known as Kanniks, is an Indian-born American musician, scholar, composer, writer and music educator based out of Cincinnati, OH... Often described as ‘The Magic Musician From Madras’, Kanniks has numerous productions, choral performances, lectures, workshops and articles to his name. He has founded and led community choirs in 10 cities in North America including Cincinnati OH, Bethlehem PA, Houston TX, Tampa FL, Ft. Lauderdale FL, Minneapolis/St Paul MN, Toronto ON, Washington DC, Atlanta GA and Chicago IL. He has expanded his work to Europe (The Hague - Netherlands). He has done extensive research on the music and life  of 19th century composer Muthuswami Dikshitar.

Career
Kanniks has trained in the classical Carnatic and Hindustani music traditions of India. He founded the Greater Cincinnati Indian Community Choir in late 1993 and produced his first musical production "Basant - A Musical Celebration of Spring" in 1994. His productions combine Indian voices, chants with Western choruses and orchestral arrangements. Kanniks has assembled and led Indian American choirs in 10 cities in the United States. His doctoral work is on the music and life of Muthuswami Dikshitar (1775-1835), one of India's foremost composers. He has regularly presented lecture demonstrations at the prestigious Music Academy in Chennai, Tamil Nadu on the music of Dikshithar. His articles on music have appeared in online forums and he has contributed to music columns in newspapers.

Choral Music
Kanniks has assembled and conducted Indian American choirs across North America. He founded the first Indian choir in the United States in Cincinnati in 1993. The Greater Cincinnati Indian Community Choir, directed by Kanniks Kannikeswaran, won two silver medals in the prestigious Champions Category in the World Choir Games 2012, held in Cincinnati Ohio. Shanti, his flagship production is an oratorio for large mixed choruses, orchestra, dance, narration and multimedia. It has been performed many times in Cincinnati, Houston, Atlanta and other cities in the United States. Recently, he produced "Sangam to Silicon Era", a choral presentation of the work of various Tamil poets through various ages, in Chicago at the 40th annual convention of the Tamil Nadu Foundation

Significant Creations
Shanti – A Journey of Peace is an oratorio for large mixed choruses, western and Indian instrumental ensembles, dancers, narration and multimedia. Shanti has recorded the participation of Indian community choirs, the Martin Luther King Chorale and the United Nations Association International Choir. Shanti has been performed by over a 1000 people in Cincinnati OH, Bethlehem PA, Houston TX and Atlanta GA. Shanti premiered in 2004 and recently celebrated its 10th anniversary in 2014.

Chitram -  A Portrait of India – tells the story of the diversity in Indian culture through Indian choral music, dance and multimedia. Chitram premiered in Dayton OH in 2005 and has been performed in Dearborn MI, Cincinnati OH, Wilmington OH, Tampa FL, Fort Lauderdale FL, Minneapolis/St Paul MN, Toronto, and HoustonTX.

Ragas in Symphony portrays the intimate relationship between ragas and the seasons of the year. Written for mixed choruses, chamber orchestra and dances, this work was presented by the Korzo Dance Theater in the Netherlands in October 2015. It featured the Surinamese Indian choir (Sharad choir), the Dario Fo choir  and the Residentie Orkest of the Anton Philipszaal in The Hague.

Sharad – A Celebration of Autumn for Indian choir, western orchestra, performed in the Netherlands (2013) and in Tampa (2014).
Colonial Interlude – Featuring the life and music of Indian composer Muthuswami Dikshitar, performed by the National University of Singapore Indian Instrumental Ensemble (March 2010)

The Silk Road – performed by the National University of Singapore Indian Instrumental Ensemble (March 2011)

The Indus Spirit – performed at the TiE Silicon Valley Convention (TiECon 2015) at the Santa Clara Convention Center (May 2014).

Other Significant Compositions

Kanniks composed the invocation that was performed by his daughter Vidita Kanniks at the reception held in honour of India’s Prime Minister Narendra Modi at the Madison Square Gardens, New York on Sep 28, 2014.

''Sul taal'' dhrupad in Raga Jog in honor of the Sai Temple in Mason OH – performed by the Gundecha brothers.

Collaborations
Kanniks has collaborated with musicians from around the world including John Morris Russell, Mrinalini Sarabhai, Mallika Sarabhai and others. His collaboration with the Gundecha Brothers resulted in  ‘Guruguha Dhruvapada’ - a dhrupad concert featuring kritis of Dikshitar rendered in the classical dhrupad style. He has worked with conductor Catherine Roma who has conducted several of his productions including Shanti. He has also worked with the Cincinnati Chamber Orchestra and the Cincinnati symphony orchestra . He recently collaborated with the Korzo theater in the Netherlands, the United Nations Association International Choir in Houston and with the National University of Singapore Indian Instrumental Ensemble, the NUS Symphony orchestra, the Dario Fo choir and the Residentie Orkest in The Hague, Netherlands.

Teaching
Kanniks is an adjunct faculty member of Musicology at the College Conservatory of Music, University of Cincinnati, since 1994. Kanniks also conducts classes outside the University in Indian classical music for children and adults of all age groups. He is the founder of the American School of Indian Art (ASIA). He was a visiting artist at the University of South Florida.

Awards and recognition
 Lifetime achievement award from the SRGMPDN forum in Washington DC (Sep 2014)
 Lifetime achievement award from the Geeva Foundation, Louisville KY (May 2014)
 Ohio Heritage Fellowship - Ohio Arts Council - 2011
 McKnight Visiting Composer Residencies - American Composers Forum - 2011
 Inaugural Award for the Advancement of Dharmic Arts and Humanities - Hindu American Foundation - 2013
 Best Lecture Demonstration/Paper at 81st Annual Conference of the Music Academy - Madras - 2007.
 Individual Artists Fellowship from the Ohio Arts Council (2003)

Research
The Indo Colonial Music of Dikshitar:
Kannikeswaran has done extensive research on the Indo Colonial Music of Dikshitar and the nottusvara sahityas. Kanniks presented a lecture
demonstration on this topic at the Music Academy - Madras in 2007 and in 2008, released the first ever recording of the  Nottusvara Sahityas in the voice of his daughter Vidita Kanniks with western (largely Celtic) orchestration. This recording ‘Vismaya - An Indo Celtic Musical Journey’ was released both in India and in the United
States. He also presents his work at the Annual meetings of the Society for Ethnomusicology. He has presented thematic programs on this topic in the presence of India’s former president Dr. Abdul Kalam, India’s former ambassador to the US Meera Shankar
and at the Media Rise Festival in Washington DC. He has presented talks, lecture/demonstrations and articles on this topic in various places in North America (including venues such as Berklee College of Music, The University of Cincinnati, The University of Texas at A&M and more), Singapore (National University of Singapore), Trinidad and India (Bangalore International Center, IIT Madras and more)

Dikshitar and dhrupad:
Kannikeswaran has researched into the various aspects of Dikshitar’s music - particularly the similarity between Dikshitar’s compositions and Dhrupad . He collaborated with the Gundecha brothers to present "Meditative Moments: Guruguha-Dhruvapada", a unique concert that highlighted Dikshitar's compositions that have similarities with Dhrupad,
in Houston in 2012 and in Cincinnati in June 2014. He has numerous articles and lecture demonstrations to his name on this topic

References

External links 
 Kanniks' Personal Website
 Templenet

20th-century American academics
20th-century American composers
21st-century American academics
21st-century American composers
American male composers
American music educators
American male musicians of Indian descent
American people of Indian Tamil descent
Musicians from Cincinnati
Indian emigrants to the United States
Expatriate musicians in India
Living people
Musicians from Chennai
University of Cincinnati – College-Conservatory of Music faculty
Year of birth missing (living people)